Efogi is a town in the Central Province of Papua New Guinea. It is served by air via Efogi Airport.

Central Province (Papua New Guinea)